Samuel or Sam Hall may refer to:

Sam B. Hall Jr. (1924–1994), U.S. Representative from Texas
Sam Hall (diver) (1937–2014), American Olympic diver and former member of the Ohio House of Representatives
"Sam Hall" (song), an old English folk song
Sam Hall (writer) (1921–2014), American screenwriter
Sam Hall (skier) (born 1988), Australian freestyle skier
Samantha Hall (born 1982), Australian environmental researcher
Samuel A. Hall (died 1887), Associate Justice of the Supreme Court of Georgia
Samuel Carter Hall (1800–1889), Irish journalist
Samuel H. P. Hall (1804–1877), New York politician
Samuel Read Hall (1795–1877), American educator
Samuel Hall (inventor) (1782–1863), English inventor
Samuel Hall (judoka) (born 1995), British judoka
Samuel Hall (politician), Lieutenant Governor of Indiana 1840–1843
Sam Hall (rugby league), rugby league player
Sam Hall (story), a story by Poul Anderson

See also
William Samuel Hall (1871–1938), Canadian dentist and politician

Hall, Samuel